is a limited express train service between Kansai International Airport and Namba Station in Osaka, Japan. It is operated by Nankai Electric Railway, and the train service uses the Nankai Main Line and the Airport Line. The name comes from the German word meaning rapid, pronounced .

The futuristic and retro-style six-car Rapi:t train sets, officially designated as the Nankai 50000 series, were designed by architect Wakabayashi Hiroyuki and won the Blue Ribbon Prize in 1995, one year after entering service.. Though the Rapi:t is one of the fastest and most convenient ways to travel from the airport to downtown Osaka, these trains are not covered by the Japan Rail Pass. Passengers traveling with a Japan Rail Pass should take either the Kansai Airport Limited Express Haruka or the Kansai Airport Rapid Service to Tennoji Station and transfer to the Yamatoji Line to JR Namba Station.

Station stops
There are two classes of Rapi:t services. Rapi:t β (beta) takes 37 minutes from Namba to Kansai Airport, stopping at Shin-Imamiya, Tengachaya, Sakai, Kishiwada, Izumisano, and Rinkū Town. Rapi:t α (alpha) takes 34 minutes, stopping at Shin-Imamiya, Tengachaya, Izumisano, and Rinku Town. All seats are reserved and non-smoking.

4 α trains depart Namba for Kansai Airport on weekday mornings (6:00, 7:00, 8:00, 9:00), and 6 depart Kansai Airport for Namba from 20:00 (2 per hour). β trains depart Namba for Kansai Airport every day, 1 per hour from 7:00 until 10:00 and 2 per hour from 10:00, and 1 or 2 depart Kansai Airport for Namba by 20:00.

Rapi:t α: Namba Station - Shin-Imamiya Station - Tengachaya Station - Izumisano Station - Rinkū Town Station - Kansai Airport Station
Rapi:t β: Namba Station - Shin-Imamiya Station - Tengachaya Station - Sakai Station - Kishiwada Station - Izumisano Station - Rinkū Town Station - Kansai Airport Station

History

The Rapi:t service was inaugurated on 4 September 1994 using 6-car Nankai 50000 series EMUs.

Rapi:t services were suspended on 4 September 2018 due to the effects of Typhoon Jebi causing damage to the airport and the Sky Gate Bridge R being damaged by an empty fuel tanker. Services to the airport were completely restored on 18 September 2018.

See also
 Haruka, limited-express service operated by JR West to Kansai Airport

References

External links
 Kansai International Airport access - Nankai Railway Official Website in English "How to enjoy Osaka"

Nankai Group
Airport rail links in Japan
Rail transport in Osaka Prefecture
Named passenger trains of Japan
Railway services introduced in 1994
1994 establishments in Japan